Asaphidion curtum is a species of ground beetle in the family Carabidae. It is found in North America, Europe, and Africa.

Subspecies
These three subspecies belong to the species Asaphidion curtum:
 Asaphidion curtum curtum (Heyden, 1870)
 Asaphidion curtum delatorrei Uyttenboogaart, 1928
 Asaphidion curtum maroccanum Antoine, 1955

References

Further reading

 

Trechinae
Articles created by Qbugbot
Beetles described in 1870